Durban Gen is a South African medical drama telenovela. It is an e.tv original production produced by Stained Glass TV Production, commissioned and distributed by e.tv. The medical drama is based in Durban and reflects on the struggles of the doctors and nurses in their daily lives at Durban General Hospital.

As of 5 August 2021 the show moved to eVOD with repeats being broadcast on the channel.

Notable Cast

Former Cast

Cast members
Season  1 
Nelisiwe Sibiya as Dr. Mbali Mthethwa
Mike Ndlangamandla as Dr. Lindelani Zulu
Mavuso Magabane as Dr. Thabo Dlamini
Duduzile Ngcobo as Dr. Nomalanga Qwabe
Ntando Mncube as Sibusiso Dlamini
Lihle Dhlomo as Dr. Precious Dlamini
Fanele Ntuli as Dr. Thandekile Zondo
Fanele Zulu as Dr. Mnqobi Mchunu
Lerato Nxumalo as Dr. Ndabezinhle Luthuli
Zimiphi Biyela as Matron Nobuhle Nkabinde
Bheki Mahlawe as Nurse Calvin Gumede
Nombulelo Mhlongo as Nurse Sne Mtshali
Tshidi Makitle as Nurse Phumeza Sibiya
Thulani Shange as Dr. Mandla Ngcobo
Monica Zulu as MaCele Gumede
Mxolisi Majozi as MacGyver 
Sifiso Sibiya as Bab'Milton Gumede
Bheki Sibiya as Dr. Muzi Ndlovu
Season 2
Nelisiwe Sibiya as Dr. Mbali Mthethwa
Mike Ndlangamandla as Dr. Lindelani Zulu
Mavuso Magabane as Dr. Thabo Dlamini
Duduzile Ngcobo as Dr. Nomalanga Qwabe
Sthandwa Nzuza as Dr. Zandile Mkhize
Fanele Ntuli as Dr. Thandekile Zondo 
Zimiphi Biyela as Matron Nobuhle Nkabinde
Bheki Mahlawe as Nurse Calvin Gumede
Nombulelo Mhlongo as Nurse Sne Mtshali
Tshidi Makitle as Nurse Phumeza Sibiya
Mxolisi Majozi as MacGyver 
Thokozisa Ziqubu as Dr. Lethuxolo Bhengu
Yola Plaatjie as Dr. Nangamso Jack
Mthandeni Mbambo as Thulani Sibiya
Sibongokuhle Nkosi as Thembinator
Mpume Mthombeni as Agatha Dlamini
Zakhele Mabasa as Paramedic Sihle Ntuli
Nyaniso Dzedze as Dr. Sphesihle Dlomo
Season 3
Nelisiwe Sibiya as Dr. Mbali Mthethwa
Tumelo Matlatla as Dr.Skhumbuzo Khumalo 
Mavuso Magabane as Dr. Thabo Dlamini
Fanele Ntuli as Dr. Thandekile Zondo
Sthandwa Nzuza as Dr. Zandile Mkhize
Bheki Mahlawe as Nurse Calvin Gumede
Nombulelo Mhlongo as Nurse Sne Mtshali 
Tshidi Makitle as Matron Phumeza Sibiya
Thokozani Ziqubu as Dr. Lethuxolo Bhengu
Yola Plaatjie as Dr. Nangamso Jack
Mthandeni Mbambo as Thulani Sibiya 
Sibongokuhle Nkosi as Thembinator 
Asanda Dubazane as Bafana Cele

Production

On 21 August 2020, e.tv announced that the new local drama series would premiere on 5 October.

According to e.tv head of local productions Helga Palmar, the series comes at a time where there is heightened attention on frontline workers.

Plot 
The series centers around a newly qualified doctor, Mbalenhle 'Mbali' Mthethwa (Nelisiwe Sibiya), who moves to the big city to complete her final year of community service at Durban General Hospital. She is torn between her fiancé, Sibusiso Dlamini (Ntando Mncube) and her superior Dr. Lindelani Zulu (Mike Ndlangamandla). On arrival at the hospital, she assists in a precarious surgery that results in the death of an MEC. This threatens the reputation of the hospital, Dr. Zulu and Mbali. Mbali is  thrown into an investigation which threatens to end her career that has not yet begun.Five years later after the death of Sbusiso, Mbali becomes a sangoma and a senior doctor. Thabo Dlamini is the new superintendent of Durban General hospital. Dlamini is married to Dr Zondo. Their relationship is nearing a breaking up. Dr Bhengu is a senior doctor as well as a social media influencer. Dr Jack is now engaged to Calvin but can't carry a child because her womb is injured. There is a new Head of Surgery in Durban Gen Dr. Sikhumbuzo Khumalo (Tumelo Matlatla) and is in a romantic relationship with Dr Mkhize. Mbali's gobela (The person who trained Mbali to become a sangoma) was raping the women who were training to be a sangoma, shot himself to escape being arrested however the  doctors quickly operated on him and eventually he got arrested.

Cast  

Main Cast
Nelisiwe Sibiya  – Dr. Mbali Mthethwa, a surgical intern. Mbali was engaged to Sibusiso Dlamini who is Dr. Thabo Dlamini's brother. Mbali finds herself in a continuous  love triangle between Sibusiso and Dr. Lindelani, but is finally married with Sibusiso and is hiding that fact that before they were married, she had no longer been a virgin. She lost her virginity to Lindelani. Her husband Sibusiso was shot dead by a drunk Thabo he killed him by a mistake. He was actually murdered by Thulani Sibiya. Five years later she becomes a sangoma and is a senior doctor. Mbali's gobela rapes one of the institutions and the gobela try to kill himself avoiding to be arrested but the doctors quickly operate him and is arrested. Mbali had a stroke caused by her angry ancestors wantng her to become a practising sangoma. She later dies for a few minutes and comes back with an agreement with her ancestors to become a Sangoma. Main role: (season 1 - present)
Mavuso Magabane – Dr. Thabo Dlamini, Chief of Surgery. He is married to Dr. Precious Dlamini but is a womanizer and has had extramarital sexual relations with a few of the nurses of the hospital. Thabo is a recovered alcoholic. He had a brief affair with Precious' friend, Zandile. He was infertile so his wife Precious, sought the help of his brother, Sibusiso in secret. Sibusiso impregnated Precious who later gave birth to their son Mvelo. Thabo found out the truth months later when the jealous Zandile blackmailed her friend to finally get Thabo to be hers. The enraged Thabo came to hospital drunk and held his wife and brother hostage and when the police intervened, Sibusiso was shot accidentally. Thabo was arrested for murder charges. It was later discovered that the bullet of the gun that shot Sibusiso belonged to the detective who was at the hospital that day, detective Thulani Sibiya, whose wife, Phumeza, works at the hospital as a nurse. Thabo was then released but then he still faced charges of attempted murder for shooting Calvin, who slept with his wife. Main role: (season 1 - present)

Duduzile Ngcobo – Dr. Nomalanga Qwabe, Superintendent. Superintendent Qwabe is the boss of Durban General Hospital. She is feared but respected. She went to Cuba with her boyfriend Dr. Ndlovu to possibly get a cure for her cancer. She appointed Dr. Zulu as acting Superintendent in her absence. She later retires for her sickness and appoints Dr. Dlamini to be Superintendent permanently. Main role:(season 1 - 2)
Mike Ndlangamandla – Dr. Lindelani Zulu, acting Superintendent and surgeon. Dr. Zulu is Mbali's love interest. After dating for some time, Lindelani deflowered Mbali and proposed marriage to her. He is a father to his daughter, Lwandle. Lindelani's wife died in a surgery, to which he blames Thabo as he was the doctor operating. Lindelani was in charge of the interns but when he became Superintendent, he handed over the intern duties to Dr. Zandile Mkhize. He left Durban with her daughter to start a new life. He came back to bring a rare blood for a sick boy.  Main role: (season 1 - 2); Recurring role: (season 3 - present)
Lihle Dhlomo – Dr. Precious Dlamini, Head of OB/Ggynaecology. Precious is Thabo's wife and is struggling to fall pregnant by her husband. Precious seems to not be happy with the state of her marriage, but stays anyway. She falls pregnant after sleeping with Calvin, but aborts the baby. She later continuously slept with Sibusiso so she could get a 'Dlamini' baby. She gave birth to Mvelo Dlamini. Due to Sibusiso's death she got depressed and was sent into rehabilitation. She was run over by a taxi and died trying to save a child. Main Role: (season 1); Recurring role: (season 2)
Ntando Mncube – Sibusiso Dlamini. Sibusiso is an ambitious businessman, who is Mbali's fiance.  He starts off being oblivious to Mbali's cheating, but finds out eventually. He constantly is at odds with Lindelani, trying his best to make sure that he and Mbali do not continue dating. He is set on marrying Mbali and finally does. He tried killing Lindelani when he found out that he took Mbali's virginity. He was shot dead at the hospital when Thabo was told the truth about Mvelo being Sibusiso's child. Main role: (season 1)
Zimiphi Biyela – Matron Nobuhle Nkabinde, head nurse. The matron takes no nonsense from both staff and patients. She constantly checks the nurses’ uniforms, at which she always scolds Sne because her skirt is always too short. Some of the employees avoid her at times, especially when she wants to give out her baked treats, or wants to sell a product. She finds herself crushing on Dr. Ndlovu, who does not share the same feelings for her. She later had a brief relationship with MacGyver. She retires five years later and Phumeza is the new matron starting from season 3. Main role: (season 1 - 2)
Nombulelo Mhlongo – Nurse Sne Mtshali. Sne is the ‘slay queen’ of the hospital, she is always on top of what is trending on social media, and always knows what is happening in everyone's lives. She is a very bubbly character. One of the running gags of the show is that Sne is always at odds with the matron because of her short skirts. She and Calvin have a close friendship. Sne is the love interest of MacGyver, with whom she has had a one night stand with. She was in a abusive relationship with her and Dr Dhlomo, she later killed him and was arrested in season 2 finale but was out 5 years later. Main role: (season 1 - Present)
Bheki Mahlawe - Nurse Calvin Gumede. Calvin is the son of MaCele and Baba Gumede. Calvin is friends with Sne, MacGyver, and Phumeza. He had a one night stand with Precious which resulted in her falling pregnant. He was shot by Thabo when Zandile told Thabo that he slept with Precious but he remained alive. He is in a relationship with Dr. Jack. Main role: (season 1 - Present)
Fanele Ntuli – Dr. Thandekile Zondo - Dlamini, surgical intern. Thandekile is an intern who is friends with Mbali and Ndabezinhle. She usually acts as the voice of reason among her friends and aims to be a surgeon after her internship. She was in a brief relationship with Dr. Ngcobo. She is now married with Dr. Dlamini and is a senior doctor. Main role: (season 1 - Present)
Zuluboy – MacGyver, paramedic. MacGyver is a good-natured person who sometimes can be dimwitted. He works closely with Baba Gumede as a paramedic. His love interest is Sne, who constantly rejects him. He is usually caught on the wrong side of his get-rich-quick ideas. Main role: (season 1 - 2)
Tsidi Makitle - Matron Phumeza Sibiya. Phumeza is a caring, soft-spoken, and well-mannered character. Her ability to tend to patients, as well as her overall diligence makes her the matron's favourite nurse. She does tend to lack social skills as well as street smarts. She is married to Detective Sibiya. Five years later in season 3 she in now the Matron of Durban General Hospital. Main role: (season 1 - Present)
Sifiso Sibiya – Bab' Milton Gumede. Baba Gumede is MaCele's husband and Calvin's father. He is young at heart. He usually is involved in MacGyver's antics. Gumede tends to also lend an ear to anyone, especially the male staff members, who is going through something personal and is willing to offer them advice. He is revealed to be Msizi's father. When his wife MaCele found out that he used their savings to pay his former mistress, she had a heart attack and died. He retired from Durban Gen and moved in with his former mistress. He comes back in season 3 for Calvin and Dr. Jack's wedding. Main role: (season 1); Recurring role: (season 2 - Present)
Sthandwa Nzuza - Dr. Zandile Mkhize. She is Precious's friend and she was married to Dr. Siyabonga Mkhize but they got divorced because Zandile did illegal abortions and she aborted their child. Precious told her all her secrets and she was blackmailing Sibusiso because she wanted money and Precious kidnapped her and drugged her because she did not want her to tell Thabo the truth about Mvelo but she escaped and told Thabo the truth about Mvelo and Precious and Calvin's affair and a heartbroken Thabo shoots Calvin and is now plotting for revenge to all those people who made a fool of him. He is in a romantic relationship with Dr. Khumalo. Recurring role: (season 1); Main role: (season 2 - Present)

References

E.tv original programming
2020 South African television series debuts
South African drama television series